|}

The Joel Stakes is a Group 2 flat horse race in Great Britain open to horses aged three years or older. It is run on the Rowley Mile at Newmarket over a distance of 1 mile (1,609 metres), and it is scheduled to take place each year in late September.

History
The event was established in 1987, and it was originally called the Main Reef Stakes. It was named after Main Reef, a successful horse owned and bred by Jim Joel. It was initially restricted to three-year-olds and contested over 1 mile and 2 furlongs.

The race was opened to older horses and cut to a mile in 1989. For a period it was classed at Listed level. Jim Joel died in 1992, and it was renamed the Joel Stakes in 1994.

The Joel Stakes was promoted to Group 3 status in 2003. The Shadwell breeding organisation became its sponsor in 2008, and its full title included the name of Nayef, a Shadwell stallion for a period. It was upgraded to Group 2 in 2011.

The race is currently held on the second day of Newmarket's three-day Cambridgeshire Meeting, the day before the Cambridgeshire Handicap.

Records

Most successful horse (2 wins):
 Benbatl - (2019,2021)

Leading jockey (4 wins):
 Oisin Murphy – Beat The Bank (2017), Benbatl (2019,2021), Kameko (2020)

Leading trainer (4 wins):
 Sir Michael Stoute – Sabotage (1989), Rob Roy (2005), Confront (2009), Mustashry (2018)
 Saeed bin Suroor -  Satchem (2006), Creachadoir (2007), Benbatl (2019,2021)

Winners

See also
 Horse racing in Great Britain
 List of British flat horse races
 Recurring sporting events established in 1987 – this race is included under its original title, Main Reef Stakes.

References

 Paris-Turf: 

 Racing Post:

 galopp-sieger.de – Joel Stakes (ex Main Reef Stakes).
 ifhaonline.org – International Federation of Horseracing Authorities – Joel Stakes (2019).
 pedigreequery.com – Joel Stakes – Newmarket.

Flat races in Great Britain
Newmarket Racecourse
Open mile category horse races
British Champions Series
1987 establishments in England